is a Japanese football player.   He currently plays for Gamba Osaka in the J1 League.

Career statistics

Last update: 20 November 2016

Reserves performance

Honors

Gamba Osaka

J.League Cup – 2014

References

External links

1995 births
Living people
Association football people from Hyōgo Prefecture
Japanese footballers
J1 League players
J3 League players
Gamba Osaka players
Gamba Osaka U-23 players
Fujieda MYFC players
J.League U-22 Selection players
Association football forwards
Association football midfielders